Oskar Hekš (April 10, 1908 – March 8, 1944) was a Czechoslovak long-distance runner.

Hekš was born in Rožďalovice, present-day Czech Republic. He competed for Czechoslovakia at the 1932 Summer Olympics and came in eighth place in the Men's Marathon. He died in the Holocaust after being transferred to and gassed at Auschwitz.

International competitions

References

1908 births
1944 deaths
People from Rožďalovice
People from the Kingdom of Bohemia
Czech Jews
Czechoslovak male long-distance runners
Czech male long-distance runners
Czechoslovak male marathon runners
Czech male marathon runners
Olympic athletes of Czechoslovakia
Athletes (track and field) at the 1932 Summer Olympics
Jewish male athletes (track and field)
Czech people who died in Auschwitz concentration camp
Czech Jews who died in the Holocaust
Sportspeople from the Central Bohemian Region